This Is What We Believe is the fourth studio album from Christian musician Aaron Shust. It was released on August 23, 2011 by Centricity Music label.

Track listing

Videos 
Shust released a video of the single "My Hope Is in You".

Personnel 
 Aaron Shust – lead vocals, backing vocals, acoustic piano, programming, acoustic guitar, mandolin
 Mike Alvarado – acoustic piano 
 Adrian Disch – acoustic piano, keyboards, synthesizers, programming 
 Seth Mosley – programming
 Ed Cash – programming, acoustic guitar, electric guitar, mandolin, bass, strings, string arrangements, backing vocals 
 Scott Cash – acoustic guitar, backing vocals 
 Ethan Kaufmann – electric guitar 
 Chris Lacorte – electric guitar 
 Tony Lucido – bass 
 Tim Jones – drums 
 Dan Needham – drums 
 Jacob Schrodt – drums 
 David Davidson – strings, string arrangements 
 Dayton Cole – backing vocals 
 Daniel Fernandez – backing vocals
 Cody Norris – backing vocals 
 Kari Jobe – lead and backing vocals (8)

Production 
 Ed Cash – producer, engineer 
 John Mays – executive producer
 Scott Cash – assistant engineer 
 Dayton Cole – assistant engineer
 Cody Norris – assistant engineer 
 Ainslie Grosser – mixing 
 Bob Boyd – mastering 
 Joanna Dee – design, layout
 Laura Dart – photography 
 Kriste Pate – hair stylist, make-up 
 Anna Redman – stylist

Charts 
The album never charted on any Billboard charts. The only song to chart was "My Hope Is in You", which peaked at No. 1 on the Billboard Hot Christian Songs chart, and it stayed on that chart for 52 weeks.

References

External links 
 Aaron Shust's official site
 Centricity Music

2011 albums
Aaron Shust albums
Centricity Music albums